The 1995 Internationaux de Strasbourg was a women's tennis tournament played on outdoor clay courts in Strasbourg, France that was part of Tier III of the 1995 WTA Tour. It was the ninth edition of the tournament and was held from 22 May until 28 May 1995. First-seeded Lindsay Davenport won the singles title and earned $25,000 first-prize money.

Finals

Singles

 Lindsay Davenport defeated  Kimiko Date 3–6, 6–1, 6–2
 It was Davenport's 3rd title of the year and the 8th of her career.

Doubles

 Lindsay Davenport /  Mary Joe Fernández defeated  Sabine Appelmans /  Miriam Oremans 6–2, 6–3
 It was Davenport's 4th title of the year and the 9th of her career. It was Fernández's 3rd title of the year and the 16th of her career.

References

External links
 ITF tournament edition details 
 Tournament draws

Internationaux de Strasbourg
1995
Internationaux de Strasbourg
May 1995 sports events in Europe